The Lamington Black Cemetery is an African American cemetery in the Lamington section of Bedminster Township, New Jersey, located on Cowperthwaite Road. It is also known as the Cowperthwaite African American Cemetery. The cemetery is a contributing property of the Lamington Historic District, which was listed on the National Register of Historic Places on June 21, 1984.

History
The cemetery was established in 1857, although the earliest burial was in 1848 (Samuel Lane) and burials of enslaved people may have taken place before 1844.  Of the 97 known graves, 37 of marked, many with plain fieldstone markers with no inscriptions. Two veterans of the US Colored Troops are among those interred here.

Gallery

References

External links
 

 Lamington Cemetery
 Courier News

Cemeteries in Somerset County, New Jersey
African-American cemeteries
African-American history of New Jersey
Historic district contributing properties in New Jersey
National Register of Historic Places in Somerset County, New Jersey